Raphael Kandra (born October 29, 1990) is a Soldier and professional Squash player from Germany.

Career 
Raphael Kandra reached a career-high world ranking of 13 in March 2019, after reaching the semi-final of the 2018 British Open - the first German to achieve this - and the quarter-final of the China Squash Open.
He won his first German National Championships title in 2018 against Valentin Rapp; he reached the final for the first time in 2013. He has represented the German national team on numerous European Squash Team Championships and World Team Championships. He won a bronze medal at the European Individual Championships in 2017.

References

External links 
 
 
 

1990 births
Living people
German male squash players
Competitors at the 2013 World Games
Competitors at the 2017 World Games
Competitors at the 2022 World Games
Sportspeople from Fürth
20th-century German people
21st-century German people